Club Deportivo Maspalomas is a Spanish football team based in Maspalomas, San Bartolomé de Tirajana, Gran Canaria, in the autonomous community of Canary Islands. Founded in 1969, it plays in Preferente Interinsular – Group 1, holding home matches at Estadio Municipal de Maspalomas.

History
Founded on 15 May 1969 as Club Deportivo San Fernando, the club was renamed to Club Deportivo Maspalomas in 1982, and played in the regional leagues until 1983, when they achieved promotion to Tercera División. In 1987, after finishing first of their group, they achieved promotion to Segunda División B.

Maspalomas returned to the fourth tier in 1990, but achieved an immediate promotion back to the third division, where they stayed for a further three seasons before again dropping a level in 1994. Another relegation followed in 2000, and the club only played a further three campaigns in the fourth tier during the decade before again going down to the regional levels.

Season to season

6 seasons in Segunda División B
14 seasons in Tercera División

References

External links
Fútbol Regional team profile 
Soccerway team profile

Football clubs in the Canary Islands
Association football clubs established in 1969
1969 establishments in Spain
Sport in Gran Canaria